evertontv (formerly ToffeeTV) is an online TV subscription channel. It allows people to view of Everton football match highlights and exclusive interviews.

The evertontv launched in conjunction with the newly designed evertonfc.com website.

Everton became one of the first clubs in the Premier League to provide live television content when they ‘webcast’ their pre-season friendlies from the United States in 2006.

A deal with Fox Sports was ensured meaning that the channel's programmes were given global distribution.

In August 2011, evertontv became a free service for registered users of evertonfc.com.

Commentators/Presenters
Elton Welsby

References

External links
http://www.evertonfc.com/evertontv

Everton F.C.
Football club television channels in the United Kingdom
Television channels in the United Kingdom
Television channels and stations established in 2006
2006 establishments in the United Kingdom